Jerzy Łojek (3 September 1932 – 7 October 1986) was a Polish historian and opposition activist in People's Republic of Poland. He specialized in European, Polish and Russian history of 17th to 20h centuries. Some of his works were first published underground. The communist government prevented him from receiving professorship.

References 
 Paweł Janowski, Łojek Jerzy, 1932-1986, historyk, publicysta, [w:] Encyklopedia Katolicka, Lublin 2006, t. XI, kol. 493.

1932 births
1986 deaths
Burials at Powązki Cemetery
Polish dissidents
20th-century Polish historians
Polish male non-fiction writers
Writers from Warsaw